Streptomyces roietensis is a bacterium species from the genus of Streptomyces which has been isolated from the stem of a jasmine rice plant from Thung Gura Rong Hai in Thailand.

See also 
 List of Streptomyces species

References 

roietensis
Bacteria described in 2017